The String Quartets, Op. 3 are a set of six string quartets published under Joseph Haydn's name by the French music publisher Bailleux in 1777 and subsequently reprinted in 1801 by Maison Pleyel as part of a series of the complete Haydn string quartets.

Long held to be by Haydn, the works had troubled musicologists as they seemed out of place in the developmental sequence of string quartets composed by Haydn. The lack, however, of surviving manuscripts made confirming that these works were by Haydn or another composer difficult, compounded by the fact that Haydn had included them in his 1805 catalog of works.

In 1964, musicologists Alan Tyson and H. C. Robbins Landon, proposed from their research that Bailleux had substituted Haydn's name for that of Romanus Hoffstetter, a minor composer later known for his admiration of Haydn, a move clearly intended by the publisher to increase sales.

In the 1980s, Scott Fruehwald claimed to "show conclusively" that the quartets were not by Haydn, based on stylistic analysis. The study also asserted that only the first two quartets were by Hoffstetter.

List of Opus 3 quartets 
Quartet in E major, Op. 3, No. 1, Hoboken No. III:13 
Quartet in C major, Op. 3, No. 2, Hoboken No. III:14 
Quartet in G major, Op. 3, No. 3, Hoboken No. III:15
Quartet in B major, Op. 3, No. 4, Hoboken No. III:16 
Quartet in F major ("Serenade"), Op. 3, No. 5, Hoboken No. III:17 
Quartet in A major, Op. 3, No. 6, Hoboken No. III:18

See also

 Violin Sonata in D major (attributed to Mozart) - Another case of a music publisher using a well known composer's name to boost sales.

References

External links

03
Haydn: spurious and doubtful works
1772 compositions